Major General Christopher Vokes  (13 April 1904 – 27 March 1985) was a senior Canadian Army officer who fought in World War II. He commanded the 2nd Canadian Infantry Brigade during the Allied invasion of Sicily. Promoted to major-general, he led the 1st Canadian Infantry Division through several battles in the Italian campaign. This included fierce house-to-house fighting in the Battle of Ortona and the advance north to the Hitler Line. In 1944, he took over command of the 4th Canadian Armoured Division and fought in the Battle of the Hochwald. During the latter stages of this battle he ordered his division to raze the German town of Friesoythe. The division subsequently destroyed around 85–90% of the town and used the rubble to make good the cratered local roads.

After the war, Vokes commanded the Canadian Army Occupation Force in Europe, before returning to Canada to undertake further command assignments. He retired in 1959 and died in 1985 at the age of 80.

Family
Born in the town of Armagh, Ireland, on 13 April 1904, Vokes was the son of a British officer, Major Frederick Patrick Vokes, and Elizabeth Vokes. They came to Canada in 1910 and Vokes's father served as the engineering officer at the Royal Military College of Canada (RMC). The family lived in the Married Quarters at Ridout Row, RMC.

Christopher Vokes's brother, Lieutenant-Colonel Frederick Vokes, took a leading part in the assault on Dieppe in August 1942. In early 1944 he was sent to Italy as commanding officer of the 9th Armoured Regiment (The British Columbia Dragoons). On 31August 1944 he was seriously wounded in action and died in a field hospital on 4September.

Early military service
From 1921 to 1925 Vokes attended the Royal Military College of Canada and was commissioned into the Royal Canadian Engineers. He then attended McGill University from 1926 to 1927 where he received a Bachelor of Science degree and was a member of the Kappa Alpha Society. From 1934 to 1935 he attended Staff College, Camberley in England. In Depression-era Canada many military bases were improved by civilians working in relief camps under supervision of professional military officers, including Camp Dundurn. The original engineer drawings for the concrete rifle range butts were signed by Chris Vokes, in that capacity. Barrack blocks in Dundurn resemble similar buildings constructed at Camp Valcartier in the same time frame.

World War II

Starting in 1939, the year World War II began in Europe, Vokes rapidly rose through the ranks of the Canadian General Staff. With the 1st Canadian Infantry Division, he served as Adjutant General, Assistant Quartermaster General, General Staff Officer, grade 1, and as Officer Commanding Princess Patricia’s Canadian Light Infantry. He proved to be an outstanding operational officer and in June 1942 was promoted to brigadier and put in charge of the 2nd Canadian Infantry Brigade. The 2nd was one of three brigades forming part of the 1st Canadian Infantry Division, with which he had served since 1939 and which was then commanded by Major-General George Pearkes until Major-General H. L. N. Salmon replaced him in September (although he, too, was replaced by Major-General Guy Simonds after being killed in a plane crash in April 1943). Vokes commanded his brigade the following year during the Allied invasion of Sicily (codenamed Operation Husky) from July−August 1943, which was followed soon afterwards by Operation Baytown, part of the Allied invasion of Italy and the beginning of the Italian campaign, in early September. One historian lauded his performance throughout the war:

Shortly after the beginning of the Italian campaign, Vokes temporarily took command of the 1st Canadian Division after its current General Officer Commanding (GOC), Major-General Simonds, fell ill, with Bert Hoffmeister taking over the 2nd Canadian Brigade. He soon became the division's permanent GOC and was promoted to the rank of major general on 1 November 1943. Vokes led the division during the Battle of Ortona, after which he was criticized for unimaginative tactics and frontal assaults. General Sir Bernard Montgomery, the commander of the British Eighth Army (under whose command the 1st Canadian Division had been serving since July), ordered Vokes's 1st Canadian Division to attack along the coast towards Ortona early in December. During an attack on a ravine southwest of Ortona, Vokes continued to send battalion after battalion to attack the mine-fortified German defense for nine days. For this he became known as the "Butcher" among his men. An impatient Montgomery sent messages wondering why the attack took so long. At the same time, the Canadians became aware of the fact that they were fighting not only Panzer-Grenadiers, but also the 1st Parachute Division, whom they recognized by their characteristic helmets. On the 21 December the Canadians broke through, and German forces destroyed the old town: the Fallschirmjägers continued to hold the town ruins for over a week, deploying mines and booby-traps. After the battle Vokes broke out in tears due to his division's losses – 2,300 casualties, among them 500 dead, as well as many cases of war neuroses.

He remained in command of the division throughout much subsequent hard fighting, including in the fighting to break the Gothic Line. Throughout most of this period Vokes's division was serving under command of I Canadian Corps, commanded first by Lieutenant-General Harry Crerar until he was replaced by Lieutenant-General E. L. M. Burns towards the end of March 1944 after Crerar went to Britain to assume command of the First Canadian Army. The relationship between Vokes and Burns, who had been one of Vokes's instructors at the RMC some twenty years earlier, steadily declined throughout 1944, with Burns eventually being sacked and replaced by Lieutenant-General Charles Foulkes, who Vokes despised. As a result, in December 1944, Vokes exchanged commands with Major-General Harry Foster, GOC of the 4th Canadian (Armoured) Division. The division was then serving in Northwest Europe, and which later fought in the Battle of the Hochwald in early 1945.

Destruction of Friesoythe

In April 1945, the town of Friesoythe was attacked by the 4th Canadian (Armoured) Division, under General Vokes. Most of the town's 4,000 people moved to the surrounding countryside on about 11–12 April 1945.

The town was defended by some 200 paratroopers of Battalion Raabe of the 7th German Parachute Division.  These paratroopers repelled the first attack by the Lake Superior Regiment (Motor) on 13 April. The Lake Superior Regiment suffered two dead and nineteen wounded. German casualties are not known. Vokes  ordered the resumption of the attack the next day by The Argyll and Sutherland Highlanders of Canada (Princess Louise's) commanded by Lieutenant Colonel Frederick E. Wigle. The attack went well, with the Argylls securing the town by 10:30 hours. However, at 08:30 a small number of German soldiers caught Wigle's tactical headquarters by surprise; resulting in the death of Wigle and several other soldiers.

Vokes determined on an immediate reprisal. "A first-rate officer of mine, for whom I had a special regard and affection, and in whom I had a particular professional interest because of his talent for command, was killed. Not merely killed, it was reported to me, but sniped in the back". Vokes then announced his draconian decision. "I summoned my GSO1 . . 'Mac,' I roared at him, 'I'm going to raze that goddam town. Tell 'em we're going to level the fucking place. Get the people the hell out of their houses first.

Units and soldiers of the Argylls had spontaneously begun the arson of Friesoythe to revenge the death of their colonel, but after Vokes issued his direct order, the town was systematically set on fire with flamethrowers mounted on Wasp Carriers. The rubble was used to reinforce district roads for the division's tanks. According to German estimates, 85% to 90% of the town was destroyed, making it one of the most devastated towns in Germany at the time. Vokes said that he had "no feeling of remorse over the elimination of Friesoythe."

Later career
From June 1945 to May 1946 Vokes was the General Officer Commanding the Canadian Army Occupation Force in Europe. Returning to Canada, he commanded the Canadian Army's Central Command and then Western Command. He retired to Oakville, Ontario in 1959 and in 1985 published his memoirs, My Story. He died of cancer on 27 March 1985, aged 80.

References

'Chris Vokes, My Story' Major General Chris Vokes, CB, CBE, DSO, CD with John P.Maclean. Gallery Publishing, 1985, 233 pages

External links

 Christopher Vokes at The Canadian Encyclopedia
Generals of World War II

|-

1904 births
1985 deaths
Military personnel from County Armagh
Canadian generals
Canadian Commanders of the Order of the British Empire
Companions of the Distinguished Service Order
Companions of the Order of the Bath
McGill University alumni
People from Armagh (city)
Royal Military College of Canada alumni
Deaths from cancer in Ontario
Irish emigrants to Canada (before 1923)
Graduates of the Staff College, Camberley
Canadian Army generals of World War II
Royal Canadian Engineers officers
Canadian Militia officers